Cellulomonas iranensis is a cellulolytic and mesophilic bacterium from the genus Cellulomonas which has been isolated from forest soil from Iran.

References

 

Micrococcales
Bacteria described in 2000